was a Japanese mixed martial artist and kickboxer who competed in the bantamweight division of the UFC. He quickly gained popularity in the Shooto organization due to his aggressive, well-rounded style and controversial persona. He moved on to K-1 Hero's, where he became the K-1 Hero's 2005 Middleweight Grand Prix Tournament Champion in December, 2005 after defeating Genki Sudo via a controversial TKO due to punches.

Though by most measures he was a natural bantamweight, many of Yamamoto's most significant bouts have been in the lightweight division as it was the lightest division in Hero's. More recently, he competed in the Ultimate Fighting Championship in the bantamweight division, although he did not perform well there, going winless in his first four fights.

Background
Yamamoto came from a wrestling family. His father Ikuei Yamamoto represented Japan at the 1972 Olympic games in Munich and his sisters Miyuu Yamamoto and Seiko both won world championships in freestyle wrestling. Kid received his education in the United States and wrestled at Marcos de Niza High School in Tempe, Arizona, capturing three state championships (with a third-place finish as a freshman). During that time he lived and received training from Townsend and Tricia Saunders. He also trained briefly under Choi Mu Bae. At the age of 21, Yamamoto made a transition from wrestling to mixed martial arts despite his father's opinion that MMA is not a real sport. His first trainer in the sport was Enson Inoue, fiancé of Yamamoto's sister at the time.

Mixed martial arts career

Shooto
Yamamoto made his professional mixed martial arts debut on March 2, 2001 against Masato Shiozawa at Shooto - To The Top 2, where he won by unanimous decision. He would go on to win his next two fights, both by TKO in the first round.

During this time Yamamoto faced future Strikeforce Lightweight Champion Josh Thomson in Honolulu, Hawaii at Shogun 1. Yamamoto dominated Thomson with takedowns and strikes but caught an accidental kick to the groin three minutes into round two, causing the bout to be ruled a no contest.

On May 5, 2002, Yamamoto suffered his first loss by TKO to Stephen Palling. As Yamamoto shot in for a double-leg takedown, Palling countered with a knee, opening a huge cut to Yamamoto's face. Though Yamamoto succeeded in slamming Palling, blood began pouring out of the cut and the referee stopped the fight. The doctors determined that Yamamoto was unable to continue and Palling was declared the winner.

Kid went on to win his next three fights over Tetsuo Katsuta, Jeff Curran and Caleb Mitchell.

Hero's
Yamamoto made his K-1 Hero's debut on April 7, 2004 at the K-1 World MAX 2004 World Tournament Open, where he choked out Tony Valente only 58 seconds into the fight. Over the next year, Yamamoto's popularity grew as he went on to defeat Kazuya Yasuhiro, Jadamba Narantungalag and Ian James Schaffa in exciting fashion.

Yamamoto would then write his name into K-1 Hero's history by defeating three highly regarded fighters—Royler Gracie, Caol Uno and Genki Sudo—to win the 2005 Middleweight Grand Prix.

Four-second knockout
On May 3, 2006 Yamamoto made mixed martial arts history when he knocked out Kazuyuki Miyata four seconds into the fight with a flying knee moments after the bell sounded. It was the fastest ever knockout in a major MMA promotion.

Olympic freestyle wrestling
In early 2007, Yamamoto announced an indefinite leave of absence from MMA to go back to his roots and train for and compete in freestyle wrestling for the 2008 Summer Olympics in Beijing. He had hoped to win the Olympic Gold medal for freestyle wrestling ever since he was a child, as his father Ikuei Yamamoto represented Japan in the 1972 Olympic games in Munich. In qualifying, Yamamoto began with an impressive win over Japanese Self Defense Forces member Akihiro Tsuchida. Yamamoto looked nimble and explosive against Tsuchida, who had taken third in the 132-pound freestyle class at the 2006 Emperor's Cup. However disaster struck in the semifinals against 2004 Athens Bronze Medalist Kenji Inoue, when in the first move of the match, an arm-whip takedown by Inoue, Yamamoto dislocated his right elbow, and was consequently prone for the easy pinfall. With this injury, Yamamoto had no choice but to leave his hopes of competing in the Olympic Games and return to mixed martial arts.

Return to Hero's
Yamamoto's return to MMA came on September 17, 2007 against future Dream Featherweight Champion Bibiano Fernandes at K-1 Hero's 10. Yamamoto won the fight by unanimous decision. At K-1 Hero's Dynamite!! 2007 on December 31 Yamamoto faced WEC veteran Rani Yahya at Bantamweight . Yamamoto won in the second round via TKO due to soccer and ground kicks.

DREAM
In February 2008, Fighting and Entertainment Group launched Dream, a new MMA promotion intended to be the successor to Hero's. Norifumi Yamamoto was one of the many former Pride and Hero's fighters that was announced to be competing in the new promotion.. He was supposed to make his Dream debut at Dream 5 against Joseph Benavidez, but the bout was abruptly called off three days before the event to a knee injury suffered by Yamamoto.

Yamamoto next announced his participation in the Dream Featherweight Grand Prix, which began at Dream.7. Due to an injury, he did not compete until the second round where, at Dream.9 on May 26, he faced future Bellator Champion Joe Warren. Despite having a significant experience advantage against the newcomer Warren, Yamamoto lost by split decision. This was regarded as a huge upset at the time considering Warren (2-0 MMA record at the time) ended Yamamoto's 14-fight winning streak.

Yamamoto lost to SRC Featherweight Champion Masanori Kanehara via unanimous decision at Dynamite!! 2009 on New Year's Eve.

Yamamoto was expected to make his Strikeforce debut against Team Quest fighter Federico Lopez at Strikeforce: Heavy Artillery, but was later pulled out by DREAM and fought Lopez at Dream 14 instead. Yamamoto defeated Lopez via TKO (Punches), claiming his first victory after two consecutive upset losses. In preparation for the fight Yamamoto decided to "reinvent" himself, moving to Okinawa to train under former WBA Light Welterweight Champion Akinobu Hiranaka.

Ultimate Fighting Championship
Yamamoto made his UFC debut against future UFC Flyweight Champion Demetrious Johnson at UFC 126. Unable to fend off Johnson's constant takedowns, he lost the fight via unanimous decision.

He was then expected to face Chris Cariaso on May 28, 2011 at UFC 130. However, Yamamoto was forced out of the bout with an injury and replaced by Michael McDonald. Another bout was scheduled with Damacio Page at UFC 135 on September 24, 2011. It too was scrapped on September 1 after both fighters sustained injuries in training.

Yamamoto then fought Darren Uyenoyama on November 12, 2011 at UFC on Fox: Velasquez vs. Dos Santos. Despite hurting Uyenoyama several times, including a knockdown in the second round, Yamamoto lost via unanimous decision after Uyenoyama controlled him on the ground for the majority of the fight.

Yamamoto's next bout was against Vaughan Lee on February 26, 2012 at UFC 144. Yamamoto rocked Lee early in the opening round with a right hand, but minutes later was wobbled by a right hook-uppercut combination from the Brit. He immediately took Lee down, but got caught in a triangle choke; Lee then switched to an armbar, handing Yamamoto his first ever loss by submission.

Yamamoto was expected to face Ivan Menjivar on September 21, 2013 at UFC 165.  However, Yamamoto was removed from the bout and was replaced by Wilson Reis.

Yamamoto returned from a three-year hiatus to face Roman Salazar on February 28, 2015 at UFC 184.  The bout was declared a no contest after an accidental eye poke by Yamamoto rendered Salazar unable to continue midway through the second round.

Yamamoto was expected to face Matt Hobar on September 27, 2015 at UFC Fight Night 75. However, the bout was scrapped as both fighters suffered injuries during the week leading up to the event.

Yamamoto was scheduled to face Chris Beal on June 18, 2016 at UFC Fight Night 89. However, Yamamoto was scratched from the bout on May 26 for an undisclosed injury. He was replaced by Joe Soto.

Kickboxing career
Yamamoto faced Masato at K-1 Premium 2004 Dynamite!! in a highly anticipated match up under K-1 Rules, and lost via decision.  The fight did a 31.6 rating and was watched by more than 34 million viewers. 

Kid Yamamoto lost to Amateur Kickboxer Percy Ramos, at the Fighter of the Year tournament, 2006 by TKO into the fourth round.

Yamamoto then faced Mike Zambidis at the K-1 World Max 2005 Tournament, he would also lose this bout by KO early into the third round. 

On July 13, 2009, Yamamoto was defeated by Korean kickboxer Jae Hee Cheon via KO at K-1 World MAX 2009 World Championship Tournament Final 8. He is now 1-3 under K-1 Rules.

Personal life
Yamamoto was married to Japanese female fashion model MALIA (マリア,新保真里有), with whom he had two sons and a daughter. They divorced in 2009.

Death
On August 26, 2018, Yamamoto wrote on his Instagram that he had been diagnosed with cancer. On September 18, 2018, Yamamoto died from stomach cancer. The type of cancer was revealed by Rizin founder Nobuyuki Sakakibara, with permission from Yamamoto's father. In the same interview, Sakakibara revealed that the cancer was diagnosed as early as 2016, but Yamamoto hid it from the public. In the beginning of 2018, Yamamoto's condition worsened to a point of where his father flew him to Guam to receive treatment for his terminal cancer.

Championships and accomplishments

Mixed martial arts
K-1 Hero's
Hero's 2005 Middleweight Grand Prix Tournament Winner
Fastest Recorded Knockout (0:04)
Shooto
All Japan Amateur Shooto Tournament Winner
MMAFighting.com
2005 Featherweight Fighter of the Year

Amateur wrestling
Japan Wrestling Federation
All-Japan Emperor's Cup Senior Freestyle National Championship 4th Place (2007)
All-Japan Emperor's Cup Senior Freestyle National Championship Runner-up (1999)
Arizona Interscholastic Association
AIA High School State Championship (1995, 1996, 1997)
AIA High School State Championship 3rd Place (1994)
Scholastic Career Record: 112-4 (1993-1997)

Mixed martial arts record

|-
|NC
|align=center| 18–6 (2)
| Roman Salazar
|No Contest (accidental eye poke)
| UFC 184
| 
|align=center|2
|align=center|2:37
| Los Angeles, California, United States
|
|-
| Loss
| align=center| 18–6 (1)
| Vaughan Lee
| Submission (armbar)
| UFC 144
| 
| align=center| 1
| align=center| 4:29
| Saitama, Japan
| 
|-
| Loss
| align=center| 18–5 (1)
| Darren Uyenoyama
| Decision (unanimous)
| UFC on Fox: Velasquez vs. Dos Santos
| 
| align=center| 3
| align=center| 5:00
| Anaheim, California, United States
| 
|-
| Loss
| align=center| 18–4 (1)
| Demetrious Johnson
| Decision (unanimous)
| UFC 126
| 
| align=center| 3
| align=center| 5:00
| Las Vegas, Nevada, United States
| 
|-
| Win
| align=center| 18–3 (1)
| Federico Lopez
| KO (punches)
| Dream 14
| 
| align=center| 1
| align=center| 1:41
| Saitama, Japan
| 
|-
| Loss
| align=center| 17–3 (1)
| Masanori Kanehara
| Decision (unanimous)
| Dynamite!! The Power of Courage 2009
| 
| align=center| 3
| align=center| 5:00
| Saitama, Japan
| 
|-
| Loss
| align=center| 17–2 (1)
| Joe Warren
| Decision (split)
| Dream 9
| 
| align=center| 2
| align=center| 5:00
| Yokohama, Japan
| 
|-
| Win
| align=center| 17–1 (1)
| Rani Yahya
| TKO (punches and soccer kicks)
| K-1 Premium 2007 Dynamite!!
| 
| align=center| 2
| align=center| 3:11
| Osaka, Japan
| 
|-
| Win
| align=center| 16–1 (1)
| Bibiano Fernandes
| Decision (unanimous)
| Hero's 10
| 
| align=center| 3
| align=center| 5:00
| Yokohama, Japan
| 
|-
| Win
| align=center| 15–1 (1)
| István Majoros
| TKO (punches)
| K-1 PREMIUM 2006 Dynamite!!
| 
| align=center| 1
| align=center| 3:46
| Osaka, Japan
| 
|-
| Win
| align=center| 14–1 (1)
| Kazuyuki Miyata
| KO (flying knee)
| Hero's 5
| 
| align=center| 1
| align=center| 0:04
| Tokyo, Japan
| 
|-
| Win
| align=center| 13–1 (1)
| Genki Sudo
| TKO (punches)
| Hero's 4
| 
| align=center| 1
| align=center| 4:39
| Osaka, Japan
| 
|-
| Win
| align=center| 12–1 (1)
| Caol Uno
| TKO (doctor stoppage)
| Hero's 3
| 
| align=center| 2
| align=center| 4:04
| Tokyo, Japan
| 
|-
| Win
| align=center| 11–1 (1)
| Royler Gracie
| KO (punch)
| Hero's 3
| 
| align=center| 2
| align=center| 0:38
| Tokyo, Japan
| 
|-
| Win
| align=center| 10–1 (1)
| Ian James Schaffa
| TKO (punches)
| Hero's 2
| 
| align=center| 3
| align=center| 1:23
| Tokyo, Japan
| 
|-
| Win
| align=center| 9–1 (1)
| Jadamba Narantungalag
| KO (punches)
| K-1 World MAX 2004 Champions' Challenge
| 
| align=center| 1
| align=center| 1:55
| Tokyo, Japan
| 
|-
| Win
| align=center| 8–1 (1)
| Kazuya Yasuhiro
| Submission (armbar)
| K-1 World MAX 2004 World Tournament Final
| 
| align=center| 2
| align=center| 2:40
| Tokyo, Japan
| 
|-
| Win
| align=center| 7–1 (1)
| Tony Valente
| Submission (rear-naked choke)
| K-1 World MAX 2004 World Tournament Open
| 
| align=center| 1
| align=center| 0:58
| Tokyo, Japan
| 
|-
| Win
| align=center| 6–1 (1)
| Caleb Mitchell
| KO (punch)
| Shooto - 9/5 in Korakuen Hall
| 
| align=center| 1
| align=center| 0:40
| Tokyo, Japan
| 
|-
| Win
| align=center| 5–1 (1)
| Jeff Curran
| Decision (unanimous)
| SuperBrawl 29
| 
| align=center| 3
| align=center| 5:00
| Honolulu, Hawaii, United States
| 
|-
| Win
| align=center| 4–1 (1)
| Tetsuo Katsuta
| TKO (punches)
| Shooto: Treasure Hunt 10
| 
| align=center| 1
| align=center| 2:45
| Yokohama, Japan
| 
|-
| Loss
| align=center| 3–1 (1)
| Stephen Palling
| TKO (doctor stoppage)
| Shooto: Treasure Hunt 6
| 
| align=center| 1
| align=center| 0:30
| Tokyo, Japan
| 
|-
| NC
| align=center| 3–0 (1)
| Josh Thomson
| No Contest (groin kick)
| Shogun 1
| 
| align=center| 2
| align=center| 2:00
| Honolulu, Hawaii, United States
| 
|-
| Win
| align=center| 3–0
| Hideki Kadowaki
| TKO (punches)
| Shooto - To The Top 8
| 
| align=center| 1
| align=center| 4:02
| Tokyo, Japan
| 
|-
| Win
| align=center| 2–0
| Masashi Kameda
| KO (punch)
| Shooto: To The Top 6
| 
| align=center| 1
| align=center| 4:17
| Tokyo, Japan
| 
|-
| Win
| align=center| 1–0
| Masato Shiozawa
| Decision (unanimous)
| Shooto: To The Top 2
| 
| align=center| 2
| align=center| 5:00
| Tokyo, Japan
|

Kickboxing record

Submission grappling record
KO PUNCHES
|- style="text-align:center; background:#f0f0f0;"
| style="border-style:none none solid solid; "|Result
| style="border-style:none none solid solid; "|Opponent
| style="border-style:none none solid solid; "|Method
| style="border-style:none none solid solid; "|Event
| style="border-style:none none solid solid; "|Date
| style="border-style:none none solid solid; "|Round
| style="border-style:none none solid solid; "|Time
| style="border-style:none none solid solid; "|Notes
|-
|Loss|| Baret Yoshida || TKO (corner stoppage) || THE CONTENDERS Millennium-1 || 2001|| || ||
|-
|Win|| Jiro Wakabayashi || Decision (unanimous) || THE CONTENDERS Millennium-1 || 2001|| || ||
|-
|Win|| Koji Komuro || Decision (unanimous) || THE CONTENDERS Millennium-1 || 2001|| || ||
|-

See also
 List of male mixed martial artists

References

External links
Official UFC Profile

1977 births
2018 deaths
Japanese male mixed martial artists
Bantamweight mixed martial artists
Featherweight mixed martial artists
Lightweight mixed martial artists
Mixed martial artists utilizing shootfighting
Mixed martial artists utilizing freestyle wrestling
Mixed martial artists utilizing kickboxing
Japanese male kickboxers
Welterweight kickboxers
Japanese male sport wrestlers
People from Kawasaki, Kanagawa
Deaths from stomach cancer
Deaths from cancer in Japan
Ultimate Fighting Championship male fighters